

Hans Piekenbrock (3 October 1893 – 16 December 1959) was a German general in the Wehrmacht during World War II. He was a recipient of the Knight's Cross of the Iron Cross.

Awards and decorations

 Knight's Cross of the Iron Cross on 4 May 1944 as Generalmajor and commander of 208. Infanterie-Division

References

Citations

Bibliography

 

1893 births
1959 deaths
Military personnel from Essen
Lieutenant generals of the German Army (Wehrmacht)
German Army personnel of World War I
Recipients of the clasp to the Iron Cross, 1st class
Recipients of the Knight's Cross of the Iron Cross
German prisoners of war in World War II held by the Soviet Union
People from the Rhine Province
German Army generals of World War II